Arkansas Highway 44 (AR 44, Ark. 44 and Hwy. 44) is the designation for a state highway in the U.S. state of Arkansas. The highway is located in Far Eastern Arkansas and is split into two sections, both of which run close to the Mississippi, St. Francis and L'Anguille rivers. The first and longest section begins at the unincorporated community of Snow Lake in far northern Desha County and ends at AR 20 in Helena-West Helena. The second section begins at County Road 239 (CR 239) in Lee County, in the St. Francis National Forest, and ends at AR 1B in Marianna. AR 44 is part of the Great River Road and Crowley's Ridge Parkway.

Route description

Gillett to Tichnor 

The western terminus for AR 44 begins at US Route 165 just north of Gillett. The route continues west through the unincorporated community of Tichnor, before ending at the La Grue Bayou about 12 miles (19.3 km) east. The route is very rural, and does not intersect any highways.

Snow Lake to Helena-West Helena 

The western terminus of AR 44 is at the unincorporated community of Snow Lake. The route is almost entirely rural for the first , intersecting the unincorporated communities of Ferguson, Mellwood and Crumrod. AR 44 eventually intersects AR 20 in Elaine, and intersects AR 85 about  farther down the road in Lake View. The route still remains incredibly rural all the way until the highway ends at AR 20 in Helena-West Helena.

Marianna to Bear Creek Lake 

The western terminus of AR 44 is at AR 1B in Marianna. The road is locally known as Martin Luther King Jr. Drive in the town. The route heads east, out of the town and enters the Mississippi River State Park shortly after, and into the St. Francis National Forest. The route continues to head southeast, and eventually ends at CR 239 at Bear Creek Lake Recreational Area.

Major intersections

References

External links

044
Transportation in Desha County, Arkansas
Transportation in Phillips County, Arkansas
Transportation in Lee County, Arkansas